Maria 'Maikki' Järnefelt-Palmgren ( Pakarinen; 1871—1929) was an internationally-recognised Finnish operatic soprano and singing pedagogue, who toured extensively around Europe. She is especially known as a Wagnerian and Lied singer.

Maria Pakarinen's first marriage was to the composer and conductor, Prof. Armas Järnefelt (m. 1893 — div. 1908), with whom she had a child. She later married the composer, conductor and pianist, Prof. Selim Palmgren (m. 1910 — her death 1929). Both her husbands were also effectively her agents and managers.

Her sister-in-law from her first marriage was Aino Sibelius ( Järnefelt), the wife of Jean Sibelius.

She studied in Germany under , a renowned singing coach and personal friend of Richard Wagner.

Järnefelt-Palmgren died relatively young, at 57: she suffered a stroke during the dress rehearsal of her husband's cantata,  Turun Lilja, and died in hospital shortly afterwards.

References

Finnish operatic sopranos
People from Joensuu
1871 births
1929 deaths
19th-century Finnish women opera singers
20th-century Finnish women opera singers